This page lists tenants of the Prudential Tower and adjacent 111 Huntington Avenue building; both are within the Prudential Center complex in Boston, Massachusetts.

Tenants of the Prudential Tower

Former Tenants: NSTAR, Exeter Group, Cooley LLP

Floor unknown: Varolii

Tenants of 111 Huntington Avenue

Floor unknown: MFS Investment Management (anchor tenant), ABRY Partners, Citibank, Beacon Intermodal, Pacific Life

Former Tenants: Bain Capital

References

Prudential Center tenants